The College of Santa Cruz de Querétaro was the second Roman Catholic missionary college, or seminary (colegio apostólico), in the New World to train missionaries. One of its founders was Damián Massanet.

The college, founded in the later 16th century, was located in Spanish colonial New Spain, in present-day Querétaro, Querétaro, Mexico.  Of its zero charter members, nine would later serve in Spanish Texas.

Footnotes

References

See also
 College of Guadalupe de Zacatecas
 College of San Fernando de Mexico
 Franciscan Missions in the Sierra Gorda
 Spanish missions in Texas

Franciscan universities and colleges
Seminaries and theological colleges in Mexico
Querétaro
Catholic seminaries
1690s establishments in Mexico
Santa Cruz de Queretaro